Max Raymond Leslie (26 June 1922 – 19 February 1966) was an Australian rules footballer who played with Geelong and St Kilda in the Victorian Football League (VFL).

Notes

External links 

1922 births
1966 deaths
Australian rules footballers from Melbourne
Geelong Football Club players
St Kilda Football Club players
Place of birth missing
Place of death missing
People from South Melbourne